Poonamallee is suburb of Chennai, India under the Chennai Metropolitan Area. It was historically called Pushpagirimangalam, later renamed in Tamil as Poovirundhavalli, and now colloquially called as Poondhamalli. It is a town in the Poonamallee taluk of the Tiruvallur district in the Indian state of Tamil Nadu. The nearest Railway station is at Avadi. It acts as the gateway to the city from its western side. It is a town with rich cultural heritage and also a fast-growing areas in the city. As of 2011, the town had a population of 57,224. There are plans to merge the areas under Poonamallee Municipality with Avadi Municipal Corporation.

Location 
The town of Poonamallee is situated at a distance of 23 km from Fort St George and 21 km from Sriperumbudur on the Chennai-Bangalore highway and 12 km from Thiruninravur on Chennai Outer Ring Road. It is located at the end of the Mount-Poonamallee Road, Poonamalle High Road and Pallavaram-Kundrathur-Poonamallee Road, 17 km from Guindy and 13 km from Chennai Mofussil Bus Terminus on the Chennai bypass. The nearest railway station is at Avadi and Thiruninravur which is nine km away and Pallavaram Railway Station on the South Line of the Chennai Suburban Railway which is 18 km away. It is also an important halting point for buses starting from Chennai Mofussil Bus Terminus and going towards Tirupati, Kanchipuram, Vellore, and other cities.

Etymology 
The name "Poonamallee" is the anglicized form of the Tamil word Poondhamalli, which might have been derived from "Poovirundavalli", meaning "the place where jasmine was cultivated". Saint Thirukatchi nambi in his last days suffered from aged illness and due to his service to Lord varadha of kanchi interrupted.  But he tried hard to reach kanchi and on seeing this lord varadha along with Lord of Srirangam and Thirupathi appeared before him and gave darshan. It is also the birth place of him. This place is also called "Lakshmipuram" and Ulagu Vuyya Konda Cholapuram.

Demographics 

According to 2011 census, Poonamallee had a population of 57,224 with a sex-ratio of 999 females for every 1,000 males, much above the national average of 929. A total of 6,496 were under the age of six, constituting 3,313 males and 3,183 females. Scheduled Castes and Scheduled Tribes accounted for 15.24% and 0.1% of the population respectively. The average literacy of the town was 78.88%, compared to the national average of 72.99%. The town had a total of 14668 households. There were a total of 22,411 workers, comprising 133 cultivators, 226 main agricultural labourers, 576 in house hold industries, 18,084 other workers, 3,392 marginal workers, 29 marginal cultivators, 35 marginal agricultural labourers, 128 marginal workers in household industries and 3,200 other marginal workers. As per the religious census of 2011, Poonamallee had 75.88% Hindus, 13.34% Muslims, 9.03% Christians, 0.02% Sikhs, 0.02% Buddhists, 0.29% Jains, 1.41% following other religions and 0.01% following no religion or did not indicate any religious preference.

Administration 
Poonamallee is governed by Municipality of Poonamallee, coming under the Thiruvallur district.  Poonamallee Municipality is situated in the West Chennai of Tamil Nadu in Thiruvallur District. This town is surrounded with infrastructural facilities and it is near to visit Chennai Metropolitan Bus Terminal (CMBT). The town's traffic is managed by the Chennai Traffic Police (CTP). The town's police comes directly under Chennai Metropolitan Police department. The town elects 1 MLA to the state legislature and comes under Thiruvallur Parliamentary constituency. The town is famous for its 8 courts including the special courts for bomb blasts. It has gained importance since this court system dealt with the assassination of former Indian Prime Minister Rajiv Gandhi.

RTO:
Poonamallee comes under RTO-Poonamallee (TN-12).
It is one of the largest RTO in Tamil Nadu in terms of vehicle registered.
Previously it was under Tiruvallur RTO (TN20).

Politics
Poonamallee assembly constituency is part of Thiruvallur (Lok Sabha constituency). 
The Current MLA For Poonamallee Constituency is  A. Krishnaswamy (DMK) from 2021 May.
The Current MP is K. Jayakumar (INC) from 2019 May.

City

Landmarks
Poonamallee is home to Varadaraja Perumal Temple. The neighbourhood has a Shiva temple which has three inscriptions dating to the 18th century CE. there are three old traditional Catholic churches and a mosque was built and completed by Rustom, son of Dhulfiquer of Astrabad, a servant of Nawab Jumlat-ul-mulk. A Persian inscription dated 1653 CE, found in the mosque reveals this information. There is also a Muhammedan fort nearby. There is also old cemetery in Poonamallee, which is the resting place of many British missionaries. The bus stop next to the cemetery says Kallarai, which is the Tamil word for cemetery.

Educational institutions

Colleges 
 Alpha College of Engineering
 Apollo Engineering College
 Panimalar Engineering College
 SKR Engineering College
 Sree Sastha Institute of Engineering and Technology
 Sri Muthukumaran Institute of Technology
 Apollo Arts & Science College
 Iqueue Technologies
 Sastha Engineering College

Schools
Some of the popular schools in Poonamallee are : 
 Apollo Vidyashram.
 Arignar Anna Government Higher Secondary School.
 Christ Matriculation Higher Secondary School.
 Daniel Matriculation School.
 Holy Crescent Matriculation Higher Secondary School.
 Jeya Jeya Sankara International school.
 Joy Bell Matriculation School.
 Kalashetra Matriculation Higher Secondary School.
 Karthik Matriculation School, Ambal Nagar.
 New St.Joseph's Matriculation Higher Secondary School.
 Pencil park school of Arts, Nambi Nagar.
 Sarojini Varadappan Girls Higher Secondary School.
 Sathya Matriculation School.
 Sri Rani Bai Matriculation school.
 St.Joseph's Matriculation Higher Secondary School.
 Sundar Matriculation Higher Secondary School.
 Thiruvalluvar Middle School, Nambi Nagar.
 Velammal Vidyalaya, Senneer kuppam.
 Hindhu Primary School.
 Government ADW Higher Secondary School.

References

External links 

 

Cities and towns in Tiruvallur district
Neighbourhoods in Chennai
Suburbs of Chennai